Elm Point is an unincorporated community in St. Charles County, in the U.S. state of Missouri.

History
A post office called Elm Point was established in 1889, and remained in operation until 1891. The community was named for a grove of elm trees near the original town site.

References

Unincorporated communities in St. Charles County, Missouri
Unincorporated communities in Missouri